Matt Carroll may refer to:

 Matt Carroll (basketball) (born 1980), American basketball player
 Matt Carroll (producer) (born 1944), Australian film and television producer
 Matt Carroll (lacrosse), lacrosse player for the Toronto Rock of the NLL
 Matt Carroll (sports administrator), Australian sports administrator

See also 
 Carroll (surname)